Say Yes to Love is a 2012 romance Hindi film directed by Marukh Miraz Beig.

Plot
Vijay (Aasad Mirza) is a young, shy boy who is molested by a prostitute which wreaks havoc with his emotions. He develops a fear of falling in love until he meets Sarah Jones (Nazia Hussain), a beautiful girl who brings about a change in Vijay's life.

Release
The released date announced is 16 March 2012

Soundtrack
"Aaj Ye Bewajah" - Sunidhi Chauhan
"Dhoondoo Mahfilon Mein Wo Jawan" - Sunidhi Chauhan
"Jab Se Dekha Hai Tujhe" - Shaan & Khushi
"Jinka Asar Kab Se Hai" - Sonu Nigam
"Koi Kaam Aisa Kar Du" - Shaan
"Tum Pe Hi Marta Hai Ye Dil" - Sonu Nigam
"Yaaden Tere Naam" - Jatin Pandit
"Ye Zindagi" - Sonu Nigam & Pritha Mazumder

References

2012 films
2010s Hindi-language films
Indian romance films
2012 romance films
Hindi-language romance films